A jugular foramen is one of the two (left and right) large foramina (openings) in the base of the skull, located behind the carotid canal. It is formed by the temporal bone and the occipital bone. It allows many structures to pass, including the inferior petrosal sinus, three cranial nerves, the sigmoid sinus, and meningeal arteries.

Structure 
The jugular foramen is formed in front by the petrous portion of the temporal bone, and behind by the occipital bone. It is generally slightly larger on the right side than on the left side.

Contents 
The jugular foramen may be subdivided into three compartments, each with their own contents.

 The anterior compartment transmits the inferior petrosal sinus.
 The intermediate compartment transmits the glossopharyngeal nerve, the vagus nerve, and the accessory nerve.
 The posterior compartment transmits the sigmoid sinus (becoming the internal jugular vein), and some meningeal branches from the occipital artery and ascending pharyngeal artery.

An alternative imaging based subclassification exists, delineated by the jugular spine which is a bony ridge partially separating the jugular foramen into two parts:
 The smaller, anteromedial, "pars nervosa" compartment contains CN IX, (tympanic nerve, a branch of CN IX), and receives the venous return from inferior petrosal sinus.
 The larger, posterolateral, "pars vascularis" compartment contains CN X, CN XI, Arnold's nerve (or the auricular branch of CN X involved in the Arnold's reflex, where external auditory meatus stimulation causes cough), jugular bulb, and posterior meningeal branch of ascending pharyngeal artery.

Clinical significance 
Obstruction of the jugular foramen can result in jugular foramen syndrome.

Additional images

See also 
 Occipitomastoid suture

References

External links 

 
 
 
 
 UCSD

Foramina of the skull